McHenry County is the name of two counties in the United States:

 McHenry County, Illinois 
 McHenry County, North Dakota